The Roman Catholic Diocese of Badulla (Lat: Dioecesis Badullana) is a diocese of the Latin Church of the Roman Catholic Church in Sri Lanka.

Erected as the Diocese of Badulla in 1972, the diocese was created from territory in the Diocese of Kandy. The diocese is suffragan to the Archdiocese of Colombo. Its cathedral is St. Mary’s church.

The current bishop is Julian Winston Sebastian Fernando, appointed in 1997.

Ordinaries 
Leo Nanayakkara, O.S.B. (18 December 1972 Appointed – 28 May 1982 Died)
Edmund Joseph Fernando, O.M.I. (5 December 1983 Appointed – 3 March 1997 Retired)
Julian Winston Sebastian Fernando, S.S.S. (25 March 1997 – 30 January 2023)
Echchampulle Arachchige Jude Nishanta Silva (30 January 2023 – present)

References

External links
Catholic Hierarchy
GCatholic

Badulla